The Red Springs Twins baseball club was an American minor league baseball franchise representing Red Springs, North Carolina, in the Class A Carolina League.  Affiliated with the namesake Minnesota Twins of Major League Baseball, the Red Springs team existed for only season —  — with the city billing itself as the "world's smallest baseball town."  Red Springs, in Robeson County, North Carolina, then boasted a population of 4,040.  (The 2000 census lists its population at 3,493 inhabitants.)

Tiny community outdrew larger city
The team, which played at Robbins Park, was created when the Wilson Tobs relocated after a 1968 season during which they drew 22,811 fans. In moving from Wilson (then a city of about 35,000) to Red Springs, the team was entering a market about one-ninth the size of its predecessor.  Red Springs had previously hosted a professional team, the Red Springs Red Robins, in the Class D level Tobacco State League, from 1947 to 1950.

Nonetheless, the Class A Twins were received enthusiastically in Red Springs in 1969 and drew 40,332 fans — almost doubling the Tobs' numbers from 1968.

Owned by construction executive Matt Boykin, the Red Springs Twins were managed by former Major League outfielder Tom Umphlett, a native North Carolinian. They struggled in the standings, compiling the poorest winning percentage (.404) in the Carolina League among its ten member clubs.  However, six future Major Leaguers were on the Red Springs roster.

At the end of the year, the Carolina League contracted to eight teams, and the Red Springs franchise disappeared from the organized baseball map. The Twins moved their Carolina League affiliate to Lynchburg, Virginia, for 1970.

Notable alumni

Steve Brye
Ray Corbin
Pete Hamm
Dan Monzon
Eric Soderholm
Bill Zepp

See also
Red Springs, North Carolina

References

External links
 Red Springs Twins' page in Baseball Reference
Carry, Peter, "A Bonanza in Red Springs," Sports Illustrated, July 28, 1969

1969 disestablishments in North Carolina
1969 establishments in North Carolina
Baseball teams disestablished in 1969
Baseball teams established in 1969
Carolina League teams
Defunct baseball teams in North Carolina
Defunct Carolina League teams
Defunct minor league baseball teams
Minnesota Twins minor league affiliates
Professional baseball teams in North Carolina
Robeson County, North Carolina
Sports clubs disestablished in 1969